Vivian Joseph Hultman (January 26, 1903 – December 27, 1987) was an American football player from Grand Rapids, Michigan. He attended and played his college football at Michigan State University. Hultman then played preofessionally in the National Football League (NFL) with the Detroit Panthers from 1925 through 1926 and the Pottsville Maroons in 1927.

References

External links
 

1903 births
1987 deaths
American football ends
Detroit Panthers players
Michigan State Spartans football players
Pottsville Maroons players
Sportspeople from Grand Rapids, Michigan
Players of American football from Michigan